Merino  is a town in the Western District of Victoria, Australia.  The town is located in the Shire of Glenelg local government area, 363 kilometres west of the state capital, Melbourne. At the 2021 census, Merino had a population of 249.

The first European settlement of the area was in 1837, when Francis Henty, brother of Edward Henty, established Merino Downs station.  Henty established the station after a report on the high quality pasture from explorer Major Thomas Mitchell at the Henty property near Portland.  A store and post office agency was established in 1854 and the first town lots were sold the next year. An official Post Office opened on 1 June 1858. The town continued to grow through the 1850s and 1860s with the construction of churches, hotels and schools.  In 1870, the courthouse was moved from Digby to Merino.  The Merino co-operative butter factory was established around 1885.  After World War I, the area was opened up for soldier settlement.  In 1955 Merino was connected to the electricity grid.

Merino has a heritage cinema which is housed in the Merino hotel. Golfers play at the course of the Merino Golf Club on Digby Road.

Traditional ownership
The formally recognised traditional owners for the area in which Merino sits are the Gunditjmara People who are represented by the Gunditj Mirring Traditional Owners Aboriginal Corporation.

References

External links

Towns in Victoria (Australia)
Western District (Victoria)